Andrei Travin (born 27 April 1979; also known as Andrey Travin) is a Kazakh midfielder and defender. He plays for FC Zhetysu, as well as the Kazakhstan national football team.

Career

Kairat Almaty
Travin played for Kairat Almaty from 1998 to 2000, totalling 3 years. In 1998, he scored 2 goals out of 4 games. In 1999, he scored 1 goal out of 20 games, and in 2000, he scored 0 goals out of 12 games. This totals 3 goals in 36 games.

Vostok Oskemen
In 2001, Travin played for Vostok Oskemen. There, he scored 6 goals out of 30 games.

Zhenis Astana
Travin played for Zhenis Astana in 2002. There, he scored no goals out of 21 games.

Cesna Almaty
Travin played for Cesna Almaty in 2003. There, he scored no goals out of 7 games.

FC Almaty
Andrei Travin currently plays for the club FC Almaty. He has played there from 2004. In 2004, he scored 3 goals out of 31 games. In 2005, Andrei scored 2 goals in 23 games. In 2006 and 2007, he has not played in any games and consequently, has not scored any goals. Andrei Travin scored a total of 5 goals for FC Almaty.

National team
Andrei Travin has played under the number 6 for the Kazakhstan national football team since 2005.

External links 
Andrei Travin at PlayerHistory.com

 UEFA EURO 2008

1979 births
Living people
Association football defenders
Association football midfielders
Kazakhstani footballers
Kazakhstan international footballers
Association football utility players
FC Kairat players
FC Zhenis Astana players
FC Zhetysu players
FC Tobol players
FC Sunkar players
FC Atyrau players
Kazakhstan Premier League players
Footballers at the 1998 Asian Games
Asian Games competitors for Kazakhstan